Bede may refer to

People
Bede (Saint Bede, the Venerable Bede) (672 or 673 – May 27, 735), a monk at the Northumbrian monastery of Saint Peter at Wearmouth
Alain Bédé (born 1970), Ivorian footballer
Boris Bede (born 1989), French player of gridiron football
Shelda Bede (born 1973), a beach volleyball player from Brazil who competed at the 2004 Summer Olympics
Bede Griffiths (1906–1993), a British-born Benedictine monk and mystic who lived in ashrams in South India
Jim Bede (1933–2015), aircraft designer, often credited with the creation of the modern kitplane market
Olga Bede (1908–1985), a Romanian Magyar writer from Transylvania

Places

Canada;
Bede, Manitoba, a locality in Manitoba, Canada.

Schools
Venerable Bede Church of England Academy in Sunderland, Tyne and Wear, England
St. Bede Academy in Peru, Illinois, USA
St. Bede's Anglo Indian Higher Secondary School in Chennai, India
St Bede's Catholic College in Bristol, England
St Bede's Catholic High School, Lytham St Annes, Lancashire, England
St Bede's Catholic High School, Ormskirk, Lancashire, England
St Bede's Catholic School, Lanchester County Durham, England
St Bede's Catholic School, Peterlee, County Durham, England
St Bede's Catholic Voluntary Academy, in Scunthorpe, England
St Bede's College, Christchurch in Christchurch, New Zealand
St Bede's College, Manchester in Manchester, England
St Bede's College (Mentone) in Mentone, Victoria, Australia
St. Bede's Grammar School in Heaton, West Yorkshire, England
St Bede's Inter-Church School in Cambridge, England
St. Bede's Prep School in Eastbourne, East Sussex, England
St. Bede's Preparatory School, Stafford in Stafford, Staffordshire, England
St Bede's Roman Catholic High School, Blackburn, Lancashire, England
St Bede's School, Hailsham, in Hailsham, East Sussex, England
St. Bede's School in Redhill, Surrey, England
College of St Hild and St Bede in Durham, England

Texts
Saint Petersburg Bede, an early surviving manuscript of Bede's eighth-century history, the Historia ecclesiastica gentis Anglorum (Ecclesiastical History of the English People) 
Tiberius Bede, the shortened name of two separate manuscripts of Bede's Historia ecclesiastica gentis Anglorum
Moore Bede, an early manuscript of Bede's eighth-century Historia ecclesiastica gentis Anglorum

Aeronautics
Bede Aircraft, an aircraft corporation founded by controversial aeronautical engineer Jim Bede in 1961 to produce the BD-1 kit aircraft
Bede BD-1, a kit-built aircraft, the first design of American aeronautical engineer Jim Bede
Bede BD-5, a small, single-seat homebuilt kit aircraft that was introduced in the early 1970s by Bede Aircraft Corp

Miscellaneous
Adam Bede, George Eliot's first novel, published pseudonymously in 1859 
 Beadsman or Bedesman, a pensioner
Bede Island, an area of Leicester, England close to the city centre
Bede Metro station, a Tyne and Wear Metro station named after the Venerable Bede
Bede people, an ethnic group in Bangladesh
Bede, the Hungarian name for Bedeni village in Gălești, Mureș, Romania
Bede, a character from Pokémon Sword and Shield

See also

 Bédé, Bande dessinée French comics